The Shed at Dulwich is a fake restaurant in a garden shed in Dulwich, London. It was created as a hoax by journalist Oobah Butler for Vice Magazine and became the top-rated restaurant in London on TripAdvisor before the listing was taken down. The restaurant was open for one night in November 2017, serving ten guests.

The faux menu theme was "moods", and Butler photographed plates of fake food created using household products including shaving foam and dishwasher tablets. One item on the menu purported to be "Empathetic: Vegan clams in a clear broth with parsnips, carrots, celery, and potatoes. Served with rye crisps."

Butler had once worked posting fake reviews of other restaurants at a rate of £10 per review, saying, "I’d look at the menu, pick something, and start lying." For The Shed, he asked friends to post fake TripAdvisor reviews in sufficient quantity to place the venue among the top two thousand restaurants in London. The restaurant attracted a single one-star review, from what Butler assumed was a rival.

After becoming the top-rated restaurant on TripAdvisor and bombarded with requests for bookings, Butler staged a genuine opening night for the restaurant, serving thinly-disguised £1 ready meals to ten customers. Having been blindfolded and then led down the alley past his house to the end of the garden and the shed, some said they wanted to come back and would recommend it.

The hoax was plausible because micro-restaurants were then a fashionable trend. Chef Tom Kerridge started a real venue called The Shed, opposite his gastropub, The Hand and Flowers, in Marlow. When launched in 2017, it was described as an “intimate private dining space.”

References

2017 hoaxes
Dulwich
Hoaxes in England
Journalistic hoaxes
Restaurants in London
Tripadvisor